A list of Dhallywood films released in 1970.

Released films

See also

 List of Dhallywood films of 1969
 List of Bangladeshi films of 1971

References

External links 
 Bangladeshi films on Internet Movie Database

Film
Bangladesh
Lists of Pakistani Bengali films by year